The 2018 Campeonato Nacional, known as Campeonato Nacional Scotiabank 2018 for sponsorship purposes, was the 88th season of top-flight football in Chile. The season started on 2 February and ended on 2 December. Colo-Colo were the defending champions, having won the 2017 Transición tournament. Universidad Católica won their thirteenth title on the last day of the season following a 2–1 win at Deportes Temuco, who were relegated to the second tier with this defeat.

Format changes
For the 2018 season, the Asociación Nacional de Fútbol Profesional (ANFP) approved a change of format from the Apertura-Clausura system that had been used in previous seasons, to a single tournament during the calendar year. The 16 teams played each other twice (once at home and once away) for a total of 30 matches. Qualification for the Copa Libertadores and Copa Sudamericana was awarded to the top seven teams at the end of the season, as well as the Copa Chile champions, while the bottom two teams were automatically relegated.

Teams

Stadia and locations

a: Audax Italiano played their home matches against Deportes Temuco and Everton at Estadio Municipal de La Pintana and Estadio El Teniente in Rancagua due to pitch renovation works at Estadio Bicentenario de La Florida.
b: Deportes Iquique played their home matches against Universidad de Chile, Universidad Católica, and Colo-Colo at Estadio Zorros del Desierto in Calama.
c: San Luis played their home matches against Deportes Temuco, O'Higgins, and Unión Española at Estadio Elías Figueroa Brander in Valparaíso due to pitch renovation works at Estadio Municipal Lucio Fariña Fernández.
d: Unión La Calera temporarily play their home matches at Estadio Municipal Lucio Fariña Fernández in Quillota due to remodeling works at Estadio Municipal Nicolás Chahuán Nazar. They played their home matches against Colo-Colo, Palestino, and Universidad Católica at Estadio Sausalito in Viña del Mar due to pitch renovation works at Estadio Municipal Lucio Fariña Fernández.

Personnel and kits

Managerial changes

Standings

Results

Top goalscorers

Source: Soccerway

References

External links
ANFP 

Chile
2018 in Chilean sport
Primera División de Chile seasons
2018 in Chilean football